There, There may refer to:

 "There There", a 2003 song by Radiohead
 There There (novel), a 2018 book by Tommy Orange
 "There, There", a 2013 song by the Wonder Years from The Greatest Generation
 There, There, a children's book by Tim Beiser

See also
 "There, There, My Dear", a 1980 song by Dexys Midnight Runners from Searching for the Young Soul Rebels